Gammel Strand (modern Danish for "old beach"; originally meant "the old shoreline", i.e. prior to land reclamations) is a street and public square in central Copenhagen, Denmark. On the south side it borders on the narrow Slotsholmens Canal while the north side is lined by a row of brightly coloured houses from the 18th and 19th century. Across the canal, Thorvaldsens Museum and Christiansborg Palace are seen on the island Slotsholmen.

The art gallery Kunstforeningen and the Ministry of Culture are the most notable institutions facing the street.

History

Copenhagen's cradle
Gammel Strand used to be the site of a natural harbour, sheltered by a few small islets later to develop into Slotsholmen. It was around this harbour that Copenhagen was founded as a small fishing and trading settlement in the 11th century. However, archeological finds show that the beach at that time was located considerably further inland. The area was marshy and boats were merely pulled up on the beach. Later land reclamations moved the coastline and a proper harbour developed.

The fish market
Later Gammel Strand became the site of a fish market, known for the women who would sit in the square at all seasons to sell their fish. It was also known as Skovserkoner (English: Skovser women) because they would buy their fish in the small fishing village Skovshoved north of Copenhagen and walk the long way to Gammel Strand to sell them in the market. They were recognized by their characteristic white scarves. In the end space became too scarce and in 1958 a new fish market opened in South Harbour.

Destroyed by fire
Most of the buildings along Gammel Strand were completedly destroyed in the Copenhagen Fire of 1795. It began in a coal and timber storage at Gammelholm, and spread to the area around St. Nicolas' Church before moving along Gammel Strand to the area around Gammeltorv and Nytorv. In the following years the houses were rebuilt.

Buildings
Most of the houses have been rebuilt and extended with an extra story over the years and exhibit a multitude of different styles. In spite of this the overall impression is very harmonic, and Gammel Strand is now considered one of the most iconic urban spaces in Copenhagen.

The oldest house in the street is No. 48. Built in 1750 to the design of Philip de Lange, it survived the fire of 1795 without severe damage. In 1796 it was extended with an extra story. Today it houses the Kunstforeningen art gallery.

See also
 Ved Stranden
 Fishwife (statue)

References

External links

 Gammel Strand  on indenforvoldene.dk
 Nybrogade census

Squares in Copenhagen
Streets in Copenhagen